Claverack may refer to the following in the U.S. state of New York:

Claverack, New York, a town in Columbia County
Claverack-Red Mills, New York, a census-designated place (CDP) in the above town
Claverack College, a former school in the above town
Claverack Creek, a tributary of Stockport Creek
Claverack Free Library, in the above CDP

See also